G-protein coupled receptor family C group 5 member B is a protein that in humans is encoded by the GPRC5B gene.

Function 

The protein encoded by this gene is a member of the type 3 G protein-coupled receptor family. Members of this superfamily are characterized by a signature 7-transmembrane domain motif. The specific function of this protein is unknown; however, this protein may mediate the cellular effects of retinoic acid on the G protein signal transduction cascade.

See also
 Retinoic acid-inducible orphan G protein-coupled receptor

References

Further reading

External links

G protein-coupled receptors